The 1997 Paris–Roubaix was the 95th running of the Paris–Roubaix single-day cycling race, often known as the Hell of the North. These are the results for the 1997 edition of the Paris–Roubaix cycling classic, in which Frédéric Guesdon won in a final sprint between eight riders.

Results
13-04-1997: Compiègne–Roubaix, 266 km.

References

External links
Results by Cyclingbase.com

1997
1997 in road cycling
1997 in French sport
Paris-Roubaix
April 1997 sports events in Europe